WLJW-FM is a radio station licensed to Fife Lake, Michigan, broadcasting on 95.9 MHz FM.  WLJW-FM airs a Contemporary Christian music format and is owned by Good News Media. The station began broadcasting in 2014, airing a Christian CHR format branded "95.9 Fuel FM".

Simulcast
In 2020, Good News Media purchased 105.5 WSRJ in Honor, Michigan for $205,000, and WLJW-FM's programming began to be simulcast on the station.

References

External links
WLJW-FM's website

Contemporary Christian radio stations in the United States
LJW-FM
Radio stations established in 2014
2014 establishments in Michigan